Guillaume Borne (born 12 February 1988) is a retired French footballer who played as a right-back.

External links
Profile at footballdatabase.eu

1988 births
Living people
People from Castres
Sportspeople from Tarn (department)
Association football fullbacks
French footballers
Stade Rennais F.C. players
Stade Brestois 29 players
US Boulogne players
AS Beauvais Oise players
AS Vitré players
Ligue 1 players
Ligue 2 players
Championnat National players
Footballers from Occitania (administrative region)